Princess Ernestine Auguste Sophie of Saxe-Weimar-Eisenach (4 January 1740, in Weimar10 June 1786, in Hildburghausen) was a princess of Saxe-Weimar-Eisenach and by marriage Duchess of Saxe-Hildburghausen.

Life 
Ernestine Auguste Sophie was a daughter of the Duke Ernest August I of Saxe-Weimar-Eisenach and his second wife, Margravine Sophie Charlotte of Brandenburg-Bayreuth, daughter of George Frederick Charles, Margrave of Brandenburg-Bayreuth.

On 1 July 1758, she married in Bayreuth Ernest Frederick III, Duke of Saxe-Hildburghausen (1727–1780). The marriage was arranged at the behest of her aunt the Queen Sophie Magdalene of Denmark.  She had been the groom's mother in law during his earlier marriage.  Ernest Frederick Charles was heavily indebted and the dowry Ernestine brought in was significant.

Carl Barth describes the Duchess as follows: "... apart from a fine half-squint of one eye, she was a beautiful, well-built lady who occupied herself passionately with music (French horn, flute, piano and violin!).  She fought, rode, hunted on horseback and on foot like a man, usually in the whole Amazon costume and tightly fitting trousers of deerskin, sitting on horseback Amazon style.  She personally led the knightly exercises of the Crown Prince".

Christian Friedrich von Stocmeier (d. 1807) was appointed steward.  His policies improved the country's tight financial situation, but he could not prevent a national bankruptcy.  In 1769 the country was placed under imperial sequestration and a debit commission attempted to consolidate the financial situation.

After the death of her husband in 1780 she retired completely.  She lived in the so-called  house on the market of Hildburghausen and dealt mainly with music.  Prince Joseph of Saxe-Hildburghausen exercised guardianship of her son Frederick, who was still a minor.

Issue 
 Ernestine Friederike Sophie (1760–1776), married in 1776 Duke Francis Frederick Anton, duke of Saxe-Coburg (1750–1806)
 Christine Sophie Karoline (1761–1790), married in 1778 Prince Eugene of Saxe-Hildburghausen (1730–1795)
 Frederick (1763–1834), Duke of Saxe-Hildburghausen and after 1826 also Duke of Saxe-Altenburg, married in 1785 Charlotte Georgine Louise of Mecklenburg-Strelitz (1769–1818)

Ancestry

References 

1740 births
1786 deaths
Ernestine
Duchesses of Saxe-Hildburghausen
Princesses of Saxe-Weimar-Eisenach
Daughters of monarchs